This is a list of the Mayors and Deputy Mayors of the City of Port Phillip local government area, Melbourne, Australia. The City of Port Phillip was formed in 1994 with the amalgamation of the City of Port Melbourne, City of South Melbourne and the City of St Kilda, Victoria, Australia.

Mayors (1996 to present)

From 1996 until 2004, the annual election of the mayor for the following 12 months occurred in March. New legislation effective from 2004 onwards changed the date of the election of the mayor to November or December. There was a truncated transitional term of office from March to November 2004. The Mayor is currently elected by a majority of Councillors each November in accordance with the Local Government Act, generally for a one-year term.

 Cr. Liana Thompson 1996–1997
 Cr. Christine Häag 1997–1998
 Cr. Dick Gross 1998–2000, 2004, 2018–2019
 Cr. Julian Hill 2000–2002
 Cr. Darren Ray 2002–2003
 Cr. Liz Johnstone 2003–2004
 Cr. Darren Ray 2004–2005
 Cr. Janet Bolitho 2005–2007
 Cr. Janet Cribbes 2007–2008
 Cr. Frank O'Connor 2008–2010
 Cr. Rachel Powning 2010–2012
 Cr. Amanda Stevens 2012–2015
 Cr. Bernadene Voss 2015–2018, 2019–2020
 Cr. Louise Crawford 2020-2021
 Cr. Marcus Pearl 2021 - current

Deputy Mayors (2012 to present)
 Cr. Serge Thomann 2012–2013, 2015–2016
 Cr. Bernadine Voss 2014–2015
 Cr. Katherine Copsey 2016–2017
 Cr. Dick Gross 2017– 2018
 Cr. Louise Crawford 2018–2019
 Cr. Timothy Michael Baxter GAICD 2019-2020, 2021 - current
 Cr. Marcus Pearl 2020-2021

See also
 City of Port Phillip
 List of town halls in Melbourne
 Local government areas of Victoria
 Port Melbourne Town Hall
 South Melbourne Town Hall
 St Kilda Town Hall

References
Former Port Phillip Mayors

External links
City of Port Phillip

Port Phillip
Mayors Port Phillip
City of Port Phillip